Phyllopezus maranjonensis is a species of gecko, a lizard in the family Phyllodactylidae. The species is endemic to Peru.

Geographic range
P. maranjonensis is found in Chachapoyas Province, Amazonas Department, Peru.

Description
It is the largest species of gecko in the New World.

Reproduction
P. maranjonensis is oviparous. The adult female lays two eggs per clutch, laying multiple clutches in one year.

References

Further reading
Koch, Claudia; Venegas, Pablo J.; Böhme, Wolfgang (2006). "A remarkable discovery: description of a big-growing new gecko (Squamata: Gekkonidae: Phyllopezus) from northwestern Peru". Salamandra 42 (2-3): 145–150. (Phyllopezus maranjonensis, new species).

Phyllopezus
Reptiles of Peru
Reptiles described in 2006